Rho Gruis, a Latinization of ρ Gruis, is a solitary star in the southern constellation of Grus. It is visible to the naked eye as a faint, orange-hued star with an apparent visual magnitude of 4.85. Based upon an annual parallax shift of 14.16 mas as seen from the Earth, the system is located about 230 light years from the Sun. It is drifting further away with a radial velocity of 31 km/s.

This object is an evolved K-type giant star with a stellar classification of K0 III. It has exhausted the supply of hydrogen at its core, causing it to cool and expand. At present it has 12 times the radius of the Sun. With 1.9 times the mass of the Sun it is a red clump star, which indicates it is on the horizontal branch generating energy through helium fusion at its core. It is radiating 67 times the luminosity of the Sun from its enlarged photosphere at an effective temperature of 4,737 K.

References

K-type giants
Horizontal-branch stars

Grus (constellation)
Gruis, Rho
Durchmusterung objects
215104
112203
8644